The discography of British boy band 911 consists of 13 singles and three studio albums. They were formed in 1995 and released their debut single in May 1996. They went on to score 10 UK top 10 singles and 10 million singles sales around the world, before their split in early 2000. The trio reunited in 2005, when they participated in the ITV reality show Hit Me, Baby, One More Time and have performed live shows occasionally since.

In October 2012, it was announced that 911 would again reunite for The Big Reunion documentary on ITV2 in January 2013.

Albums

Studio albums

Compilation albums

Video albums

Extended plays

Singles

As lead artist

As featured artist

References

Discographies of British artists
Pop music group discographies
Discography